For the Agreement was a Catalan electoral alliance formed by the Unified Socialist Party of Catalonia (PSUC) and Party of Labour of Catalonia (PTC) to contest the 1979 Spanish Senate election. The PSUC had formed the Agreement of the Catalans in the preceding election together with the Socialist Party of Catalonia–Congress (PSC–C), the Catalan Socialist Federation (FSC), Republican Left of Catalonia (ERC) and Catalan State (EC), but the alliance broke up into two in early 1979, the other part coalescing around the New Agreement alliance.

Composition

Electoral performance

Senate

Notes

References

1979 establishments in Catalonia
1979 disestablishments in Catalonia
Defunct political party alliances in Spain
Defunct political parties in Catalonia
Political parties established in 1979
Political parties disestablished in 1979